Einius Petkus (born 29 May 1970) is a Lithuanian rower. He competed at the 1992 Summer Olympics and the 1996 Summer Olympics.

References

1970 births
Living people
Lithuanian male rowers
Olympic rowers of Lithuania
Rowers at the 1992 Summer Olympics
Rowers at the 1996 Summer Olympics
Sportspeople from Vilnius